The Original Jacket Collection is a Classical Music boxed set reissue series undertaken by Sony Classical.

Format
Compact Discs in the series mostly replicate the content of the original LP albums.  In addition to the musical programming, the original LP front and back covers are duplicated.  Most Original Jacket boxes contain ten CDs.  Exceptions have included a 13-CD set of Mahler, Brucker, and Wagner conducted by Bruno Walter, and 70 and 80-CD sets for Vladimir Horowitz and Glenn Gould, respectively.

In 2010, the series name was changed to Original Album Collection.

Issues in the series
The sets have been issued since the series inception.

References

External links
  Official site

Classical albums
Album series
Sony Classical Records albums